WSJO (104.9 FM, "SoJO 104.9") is a commercial radio station licensed to serve Egg Harbor City, New Jersey. The station is owned by Townsquare Media, through licensee Townsquare License, LLC, and broadcasts a Top 40 (CHR) format.

WSJO broadcasts to the Atlantic City area and greater southern New Jersey, including Cherry Hill and other eastern suburbs of Philadelphia. When the station first hit the air in 2004, its programming originated from studios shared with New Jersey 101.5 in Ewing Township, New Jersey, outside its primary coverage area. Today, the station is programmed from the Townsquare cluster in Northfield, NJ, well within the Atlantic City market. That cluster includes WFPG, Atlantic City (Lite Rock 96.9), WENJ, Millvile (97.3 ESPN), WPUR, Atlantic City (Cat Country 107.3) and WPGG, Atlantic City (WPG Talk Radio 95.5).

History
The FM station began operations in 1971 as WRDR on 104.9 FM. The city-of-license was, and still is Egg Harbor City. It, along with its AM simulcast counterpart, WRDI, was known as "WRD Radio", with studios on the White Horse Pike in Hammonton, NJ, the city-of-license for WRDI. Broadcasts consisted of an MOR music format, along with high school sports and live area events, like remotes from Hammonton's annual Our Lady of Mount Carmel Festival and the Red, White and Blueberry Festival. The stations were owned by Delaware Valley radio veteran Jim Rodio (d/b/a Rodio Radio). In 1980, Rodio sold the AM station and WRDR went it alone from new studios on Philadelphia Avenue in Egg Harbor City, using a syndicated "live assist" standards/MOR format called "Unforgettable" from Toby Arnold and Associates. Now known as "Unforgettable FM 105 WRDR," the format was augmented by music from a record library. One of the stations biggest features was Rodio's Saturday evening "Bandstand" program highlighting the Big Band years. The station had also aired Philadelphia Phillies baseball and Philadelphia Flyers hockey.

In 1997, Rodio sold WRDR to New Jersey Broadcasting, who "updated" the format by hiring former WIP, Philadelphia music director Bob Russo as program director. Russo was instrumental in starting WIP on the road to Adult Contemporary from MOR in the 1970s, and WRDR adopted his early-1970s music mix that straddled the two formats, augmented by some later compatible music. The station sounded very much like WIP had in the 1970s.

In 1999 the station was sold again and became WEMG-FM with a Spanish-language format from Mega Broadcasting. The station was simulcast with Mega's "Mega 1310 AM" in Camden, and both stations adopted the "Mega 104.9" moniker.

After another sale in 2003, this time to Nassau Broadcasting, the station began simulcasting the company's "97.5 PST" (CHR WPST Trenton), before airing country music for much of the summer. It's been rumored, but never confirmed, that a prior agreement between Millennium Radio, owners of "Cat Country 107.3" WPUR in Atlantic City, and Nassau precluded either company airing a competitive format in markets where they both owned stations. Nassau then switched 104.9 FM to smooth jazz as WOJZ in late August.

After yet another sale, to competitor Millennium in 2004, the current call sign and format were instituted.

In 2011, WSJO, along with the rest of the Millennium-Atlantic City cluster, was sold to Townsquare Media, the current owner.

In November 2015, WSJO added the programming of WPGG 1450 Atlantic City on HD2, and Beach Radio which is used on former WOBM-AM on HD3. In May 2016, Hope Christian Church of Marlton's Hope FM went on HD4.

Translators
The following two translators simulcast the programming of WSJO-HD2 or HD3:

References

External links
WSJO official website

SJO
Egg Harbor City, New Jersey
Contemporary hit radio stations in the United States
Townsquare Media radio stations